Choti Sarrdaarni is an Indian Hindi language romantic drama television series produced by Cockcrow and Shaika Entertainment. It premiered on 1 July 2019 on Colors TV and ended on 10 June 2022 completing 810 episodes. It starred Nimrit Ahluwalia, Avinesh Rekhi and Mahir Pandhi.

Plot
Meher Kaur Dhillon is the bubbly and carefree daughter of village Sarpanch Kulwant Kaur. without her family knowing, Meher has an affair with Manav Sharma, who works as a Dhaba, she gets pregnant with his child, upon knowing that Kulwant stabs and throws him in river. Then to become MLA, she forces Meher to marry Sarabjit Singh Gill, the widowed president of Amritsar ruling party who has a 5 year old son Paramjit. To save her unborn child from Kulwant, Meher agrees and marries Sarab.

Meher reveals her pregnancy to Sarab, who initially gets enraged but later accepts her child. Eventually, they begin falling in love, and Meher delivers a son, Karanjeet. Sarab's half-sister, Aditi, enters for revenge due to her toxic past. Alive but having lost memory, Manav comes back and falls in love with and marries Aditi. Upon regaining his memory, he learns about Karan being his son but later hands over him to Sarab, and moves on with Aditi. Meher is jailed, for the allegation of murdering her brother Jagga. Sarab fails to save her.

5 years later
Meher has been bailed and now resides in Kashmir with her daughter, Seher. Sarab, Karan and Param who were in abroad return to India. It turns out the Gills' accountant, Tarkash killed Jagga and gets jailed. Sarab reconciles with Meher, and accepts Seher. He also unites Meher with her alive father, Trilochan Singh Dhillon. However sadly later, Sarab and Meher die in an accident.

16 years later
Param, Karan and Seher grow up. Seher befriends Rajveer Singh Babbar, who falls in love with her at first sight but gets heartbroken when she introduces her boyfriend Kunal Malhotra to him and then Seher gets engaged to Kunal. However Rajveer's sister Harshdeep, who is Punjab's CM blackmails and kills Kunal. Finally later, Seher and Rajveer marry and soon fall in love. She then gets pregnant but miscarries. Rajveer leaves Harshdeep upon knowing she killed Kunal, and moves to Gill mansion. It is revealed that Seher's cousin, Khushi Bajwa was in love with Rajveer 4 years ago, but also has a child Prince whose real father is her friend Avinash Gupta. After Khushi leaves, Seher and Rajveer adopt Prince.

Kulwant reveals Seher about her illegitimate granddaughter, Mannat Kaur who was left by her due to social fear. Grown up, she now lives in Dalhousie with her mother Harnoor, who later dies after revealing to Mannat about Dhillons. Seher decides to get Mannat back. Mannat comes across Dolly's grandson, Zorawar Singh Randhawa in Dalhousie, and then arrives in Attari to live with Gills and Dhillons, hiding her identity. Later, Kulwant finds Mannat's truth and reunites with her. Eventually, Seher and others too find that Mannat is Bittu and Harnoor's daughter.

Later, Zorawar and Mannat falls in love with each other. However, Kulwant decides to get Mannat married to Nirvair and Dolly decides to get Zorawar married to Scarlet. However, Kulwant later gives in to Mannat's demands and gets her married to Zorawar. The family comes together and clicks a family photo alongside the portrait of Sarab and Meher while Choti Sarrdaarni comes to an end.

Cast

Main
 Nimrit Ahluwalia as 
 Meher Kaur Dhillon  Gill – Kulwant and Trilochan's daughter; Jagga, Bittu and Rana's sister; Manav's former love interest; Sarab's second wife; Karan and Seher's mother; Param's adoptive mother. (2019–2021) (Dead)
 Seher Kaur Gill Babber – Meher and Sarab's daughter; Param and Karan's half-sister; Kunal's ex-fiancée; Rajveer's wife; Prince's adoptive mother. (2021–2022)
 Kevina Tak as Child Seher Kaur Gill (2021)
 Avinesh Rekhi as Sarabjeet "Sarab" Singh Gill – Smriti and Sukhwinder's son; Harleen's brother; Aditi's half-brother; Simran's widower; Meher's husband; Param and Seher's father; Karan's adoptive father. (2019–2021) (Dead)
 Mahir Pandhi as Rajveer "Raj" Singh Babbar – Devender's son; Harshdeep's brother; Seher's husband; Prince's adoptive father. (2021–2022)
 Amandeep Sidhu as Mannat Kaur Dhillon Randhawa – Bittu and Harnoor's daughter; Gullu's half-sister; Zorawar's wife. (2022)
 Zara Khan as Child Mannat Kaur Dhillon (2022)
 Gaurav Bajaj as Zorawar "Zorro" Singh Randhawa – Simrat and Inderpal's son; Kiara's brother; Scarlet's ex-fiancé; Mannat's husband. (2022)
 Vihaan Thakkar as Child Zorawar Singh Randhawa (2022)

Recurring
Anita Raj as Kulwant Kaur Dhillon – Trilochan's wife; Jagga, Bittu, Ranna and Meher's mother; Yuvi, Karan, Seher, Mannat, Gullu and Cherry's grandmother; Param's adoptive grandmother. (2019–2022)
Shehzada Dhami / Vineet Raina / Hitanshu Jinsi as Paramjeet "Param" Singh Gill – Simran and Sarab's son; Meher's adoptive son; Seher's half-brother; Karan's adoptive brother; Devika's ex-fiancé. (2021–2022)
 Aekam Binjwe as Teenage Param Singh Gill (2021)
 Kevina Tak as Child Param Singh Gill (2019–2021)
Adhik Mehta as Karanjeet "Karan" Singh Gill/Sharma – Meher and Manav's son; Sarab's adoptive son; Seher's half-brother; Param's adoptive brother. (2021-2022)
 Gaurika Sharma as Child Karan Singh Gill (2021)
 Aayat Khan as Baby Karan Singh Gill/Sharma (2020–2021)
Varun Toorkey as Kunal Malhotra – Seher's ex-fiancé (2021) (Dead)
Apara Mehta as Manmita Chaddha – Seher, Karan and Param's caretaker; Tricky's grandmother (2021)
 Prince Rochlani as Tricky Chaddha – Manmita's grandson; Param, Karan and Seher's brother-figure (2021)
 Mansi Sharma / Simran Sachdeva as Harleen Kaur Gill Bajwa – Smriti and Sukhwinder's daughter; Sarab's sister; Aditi's half-sister; Robbie's wife; Khushi's mother; Prince's grandmother (2019–2022)
 Krishna Soni as Rubinder "Robbie" Bajwa – Vidita's son; Ginni's brother; Harleen's husband; Khushi's father; Prince's grandfather (2019–2022)
 Sheetal Ranjankar / Jazz Sodhi as Khushi Bajwa – Harleen and Robbie's daughter; Avinash's former lover; Prince's mother (2022) 
 Hanshika Rajput as Child Khushi Bajwa (2019–2021)
 Het Patel / Laksh Pravin Jain / Ravya Sadhwani as Diljit "Prince" Singh Babbar – Khushi and Avinash's son; Seher and Rajveer's adoptive son (2022)
 Arjun Singh Shekhawat as Avinash Gupta – Khushi's best friend and lover; Prince's father (2022)
 Hitesh Bharadwaj as Manav Sharma / Fake Vikram Diwan – Surya and Seema's adopted son; Meher's former love interest; Aditi's husband; Karan's father. (2019–2021)
 Drishti Garewal as Dr. Aditi Kaur Gill Sharma/Bedi – Sukhwinder's daughter; Harleen and Sarab's half-sister; Manav's wife. (2020–2021)
 Astha Agarwal as Kiara Kaur Randhawa – Simrat and Inderpal's daughter; Zorawar's sister. (2022)
 Dolly Minhas as Daljeet "Dolly" Shregill Randhawa – Jolly and Smriti's sister; Inderpal's mother; Kiara and Zorawar's grandmother (2019–2022)
 Karan Mehat as Inderpal Singh Randhawa – Dolly's son; Simrat's husband; Kiara and Zorawar's father (2022)
 Harleen Kaur Rekhi as Simrat Kaur Randhawa – Inderpal's wife; Kiara and Zorawar's mother (2022)
 Amal Sehrawat as Jagjit "Jagga" Singh Dhillon – Kulwant and Trilochan's eldest son; Bittu, Ranna and Meher's brother; Amrita's husband; Yuvi's father (2019–2021)
 Abhilasha Jakhar as Amrita Kaur Dhillon – Jagga's wife; Yuvi's mother (2019–2021)
 Ravi Chhabra as Yuvraj "Yuvi" Singh Dhillon – Amrita and Jagga's son (2021)
 Dhan Tejas as Teenage Yuvi Singh Dhillon (2021)
 Advit Sood as Child Yuvi Singh Dhillon (2019–2021)
 Abhishek Jangra as Baljeet "Bittu" Singh Dhillon – Kulwant and Trilochan's second son; Jagga, Ranna and Meher's brother; Harnoor's former lover; Jeeto's husband; Mannat and Gullu's father (2019–2022)
 Yuvleen Kaur as Jeevani "Jeeto" Kaur Dhillon – Bittu's wife; Gullu's mother (2019–2022)
 Raanav Sharma as Gulzar "Gullu" Singh Dhillon – Jeeto and Bittu's son; Mannat's half-brother (2021-2022)
 Abhianshu Vohra as Ranbir "Ranna" Singh Dhillon – Kulwant and Trilochan's youngest son; Jagga, Bittu and Meher's brother; Ginni's husband; Cherry's father (2019–2022)
 Jinal Jain / Geetika Mehandru as Ginni Bajwa Kaur Dhillon – Vidita's daughter; Robbie's sister; Ranna's wife; Cherry's mother (2019–2022) 
 Ravya Sadhwani as Cherry Kaur Dhillon – Ginni and Ranna's daughter (2021–2022)
Mandeep Bamra / Acherr Bharadwaj as Nikhil Deol – Anurita's brother; Rajveer's friend (2021)
Neha Rana as Anurita – Nikhil's sister; Param and Karan's love interest (2021)
 Aryan Arora as Gagandeep "Gagan" Jamwal – Seher's best friend (2021)
Vibha Chibber as Harshdeep Kaur Babbar Gadgill – Devender's daughter; Rajveer's sister; Kulbir's wife (2021)
Sanjay Mangnani as Bobby Verma – Harshdeep's employee; Dimpy's husband (2021)
Heena Soni as Dimple "Dimpy" Verma – Harshdeep's employee; Bobby's wife (2021)
Mamta Luthra / Alka Badola Kaushal as Rimple Kaur Babbar – Balwinder's wife (2021)
 Raju Pandit as Balwinder Singh Babbar – Devender's brother; Rimple's husband (2021)
 Piya Valecha as Dr. Gayatri Sahni – Seher and Rajveer's doctor (2021)
 Puja Sharma as Nimrat "Nimmi" Bhullar – Seher's friend (2021)
 Dimple Bagroy as Gillori – The lady who mistreated orphanage kids (2021)
 Ayesha Singh as Malani Gandhi – Air hostess (2021)
 Rutuja Sawant as Devika / Malaika – Param's ex-fiancée (2022)
 Alika Nair / Anjali Gupta as Harnoor Sandhu: Bittu's former lover; Mannat's mother (2022) (Dead)
 Jassi Kapoor as Inspector Gunwant "GST" Singh Tawde: Mannat's friend (2022)
 Rishikesh Ingley as Akhil Arora: Zorawar's manager (2022)
 Irina Rudakova as Scarlet: Zorawar's ex-fiancee (2022)
 Neha Narang as Preeti  (2019)
Puneet Issar as Beant Singh Gill – Sukhwinder's brother; Amrit's husband (2021)
 Rinku Dhawan as Amrit Kaur Gill – Beant's wife (2021)
 Abhishek Rawat as Shekhar Ram Kaul – Meher and Seher's landlord in Kashmir (2021)
 Shivangi Verma as Samaira Sethi – Sarab's colleague (2021)
 Ramnitu Chaudhery as Saloni Majumdar – Sarab's college friend (2021)
 Neelu Kohli as Vidita Bajwa – Robbie and Ginni's mother; Khushi and Cherry's grandmother; Prince's great-grandmother (2020)
 Kaushal Kapoor as Surya Diwan – Seema's husband; Vikram's father; Manav's adoptive father (2020) (Dead)
 Vishavpreet Kaur as Seema Diwan – Surya's wife; Vikram's mother; Manav's adoptive mother (2020)
 Ranjeev Verma as Jolly Shergill – Dolly and Smriti's brother (2019)
 Avtar Gill as Avtaar Kohli – Neerja's husband; Simran's father; Param's grandfather (2019)
 Vineeta Malik as Neerja Kohli – Avtaar's wife; Simran's mother; Param's grandmother (2019)
 Shivendraa Om Saainiyol as Tarkash – Sarab's family accountant; Arati's husband; Ritu's father; Jagga's murderer (2019–2021)
 Bhavini Gandhi as Arati – Tarkash's wife; Ritu's mother (2020–2021)
 Krisha Pandirkar as Ritu – Tarkash and Arati's daughter; Param and Yuvi's friend (2020–2021)
 Delnaaz Irani as Kristan Martha – Meher and Sarab's boss in Serbia (2020)
 Shivani Gosain as Vijeyta Malik – Income tax officer (2019)
 Jai Vats as Dr. Surinder Sodhi (2020)
 Mala Salariya as Dr. Sanjana Shinde (2020)
 Prakhar Shukla as Blackmailer (2020)
 Ram Yashvardhan as Police Inspector Rajan Chautala – Sandhya's enemy who framed Meher (2021)
 Kratika Sengar as Sandhya Shastri – Meher's friend; Sameer's wife; Param, Karan and Seher's guardian (2021)
 Ankit Gera as Sameer Shastri – Sandhya's husband (2021)

Special Appearances

 Unknown as Simran Kohli Kaur Gill – Neerja and Avtaar's daughter; Sarab's late wife; Param's mother (2019)
 Shefali Rana as Shekhar Kaul's mother (2021)
 Unknown as Trilochan Singh Dhillon: Kulwant's husband; Jagga, Meher, Bittu and Ranna's father; Yuvi, Karan, Seher, Mannat, Gullu and Cherry's grandfather (2021)
 Prakash Ramchandani as Kuljeet Singh Gadgill: Harshdeep's husband (2021)
 Arpita Pandey as Sukhpreet "Sukhi" Kaur Grewal: Nimmi's friend (2021)
 Unknown as Pushpa Rathore: Jaswant's wife; Ajit's mother; Devika's fake mother (2022)
 Ajay Dutt as Jaswant Rathore: Pushpa's husband; Ajit's father; Devika's fake father (2022)
 Shubh Karaan as Ajit Rathore: Pushpa and Jaswant's son; Devika's fake brother (2022)
 Unknown as Kavita Rajput: Blood donor (2022)
 Unknown as Kavita's husband (2022)
 Sudesh Berry as Guruji (2022)
 Unknown as Sandhu's father (2020)
 Lokesh Batta as 
 Mr. Sandhu: Ginni's ex-fiance (2020)
 Nirvair Singh Brar: Mannat's ex-fiance (2022)
 Unknown as Nirvair's father (2022)

Guests
Devoleena Bhattacharjee in a dance performance at Sarab and Meher's sangeet (2019)
Meera Deosthale as Vidya Singh from Vidya (2019)
Namish Taneja as Vivek Singh from Vidya (2019)
Salman Khan to promote Dabangg 3 (2019)
Sonakshi Sinha to promote Dabangg 3 (2019)
Sai Manjrekar to promote Dabangg 3 (2019)
Arjit Taneja as Azaan Mirza from Bahu Begum (2019)
Samiksha Jaiswal as Noor Mirza from Bahu Begum (2019)
Taapsee Pannu to promote Thappad (2020)
Riya Shukla as Lavanya "Pinky" Kashyap from Naati Pinky Ki Lambi Love Story (2020)
Helly Shah as Riddhima Raisinghania from Ishq Mein Marjawan 2 (2020)
Amardeep Garg as Ganja Paaji from Radhe Krishna (2020)
Priyanka Choudhary as Tejo Kaur Sandhu from Udaariyaan (2021)
 Ankit Gupta as Fateh Singh Virk from Udaariyaan (2021)
 Isha Malviya as Jasmin Kaur Sandhu from Udaariyaan (2021)

Production

Development
Based in Amritsar, Punjab, the series is mainly filmed in Mumbai. In November 2019, the honeymoon sequence was filmed in Serbia.

On 12 September 2019, the filming was held for three hours due to the fight by the workers’ union and Allied Mazdoor Union with producers owing to due in payments.

Casting
In February 2021, the show took a 5 years leap and female child artist Kevina Tak, who played as Param, roped to play as Meher and Sarab's daughter, Seher. Child artists Aekam Binjwe, Gaurika Sharma and Dhan Tejas entered to play as Param, Karan and Yuvi after leap.

In July 2021, it was announced that the show would take a leap of 16 years and Nimrit Kaur Ahluwalia will play the role of her daughter Seher. It was officially confirmed with the release of the promo showing the 16 year leap with new characters Mahir Pandhi and Varun Toorkey, whereas the exit of Avinesh Rekhi, Anita Raj and other supporting actors. Actors Shehzada Dhami and Adhik Mehta roped to play as adult Param and Karan. However, Anita Raj and Mansi Sharma returned as Kulwant Kaur and Harleen Gill in late 2021 and then few more supporting actors came back in January/February 2022.

In December 2021, Shehzada Dhami quit the show and Vineet Raina replaces him. In February 2022, Raina too quit and was replaced by Hitanshu Jinsi.

In March 2022, it was announced that Nimrit Ahluwalia is leaving the show due to her health issues and Mahir Pandhi is leaving too. Amandeep Sidhu announced to play the role of Mannat Kaur and Dishank Arora, Salman Shaikh was approached to play Zoravar Singh, new male lead of the show, but Gaurav S Bajaj replaced them. In late March 2022, it was announced that Hitanshu Jinsi is quitting the show.

Filming
The production and airing of the show was halted indefinitely in late March 2020 due to the coronavirus outbreak. The filming resumed after three months and the show started airing again on 13 July 2020. During the break, the main actors Rekhi, Ahluwalia and Tak shot a few episodes from their homes during the nationwide lockdown which streamed under Lockdown Special Episodes on Colors TV's official digital platform Voot.

The production was halted for few days from 1 September 2020 after Krishna Soni tested positive for coronavirus.

Cancellation
In early May 2022, it was announced that Choti Sarrdaarni will telecast its last episode on 27 May 2022 but it didn't. Then on 10 June 2022, it telecasted its last episode.

Reception

Critical response
The initial promo based on Gurudwara background of the series created disappointment between the Sikhs and a complaint protesting it was written to the channel by All India Sikh Students Federation as they considered some portrayal hurting their sentiments.

Ratings
In week 41 of 2020, it became the fourth most watched Hindi GEC in urban with 5.281 million impressions.

Adaptations

Crossover
In December 2019, Choti Sarrdaarni and Vidya had a crossover while Salman Khan, Sonakshi Sinha and Sai Manjrekar appeared to promote their upcoming film Dabangg 3.

References

<https://www.tellychakkar.com/tv/tv-news/actress-geetika-mehandru-aka-ginni-of-chhoti-sardarni-gets-injured-210119/>

<https://www.m.khaskhabar.com//news.php/television-news-kabir-singh-actress-geetika-mehandru-joins-choti-sarrdaarni-news-hindi-1-444826-KKN.html?short_url=television-news-kabir-singh-actress-geetika-mehandru-joins-choti-sarrdaarni-news-hindi-1-444826-KKN/>

<https://www.latestly.com/entertainment/tv/kabir-singh-actress-geetika-mehandru-joins-choti-sarrdaarni-1862734.html/>

External links
 

2019 Indian television series debuts
Indian drama television series
Colors TV original programming
Hindi-language television shows
Television shows set in Punjab, India
Sikhism in fiction